The 2022 Kilkenny Intermediate Hurling Championship was the 58th staging of the Kilkenny Intermediate Hurling Championship since its establishment by the Kilkenny County Board in 1929. The championship ran from 17 September 2022 to 23 October 2022.

The final was played on 23 October 2022 at UPMC Nowlan Park in Kilkenny, between Danesfort and Thomastown, in what was their first ever meeting in the final. Danesfort won the match by 1-36 to 4-25 to claim their third championship title overall and a first title in 11 years.

Danesfort's Richie Hogan was the championship's top scorer with 0-33.

Team changes

To Championship

Promoted from the Kilkenny Junior Hurling Championship
 Mooncoin

Relegated from the Kilkenny Senior Hurling Championship
 Rower-Inistioge

From Championship

Promoted to the Kilkenny Senior Hurling Championship
 Glenmore

Relegated to the Kilkenny Junior Hurling Championship
 John Locke's

Results

First round

Relegation playoff

Quarter-finals

Semi-finals

Final

Championship statistics

Top scorers

Overall

In a single game

References

External link

 Kilkenny GAA website

Kilkenny Intermediate Hurling Championship
Kilkenny Senior Hurling Championship